Jordan Renson (born 14 May 1996) is a Belgian footballer who currently plays for Patro Eisden.

References

Jordan Renson ruilt STVV voor Club Brugge, nieuwsblad.be, 31 August 2015

External links

1996 births
Living people
Belgian footballers
Sint-Truidense V.V. players
Club Brugge KV players
Lommel S.K. players
K. Patro Eisden Maasmechelen players
Belgian Pro League players
Belgian Third Division players
Association football defenders
Footballers from Liège